MasterArt21 is a modern art museum in Multan, Punjab, Pakistan. Within an intentionally limited scope of subject matter, MasterArt21 presents different artists’ work at the exhibitions held from time to time.

Museums in Punjab, Pakistan
Multan District